Queen of Thebes can refer to:

Nycteïs, wife of Polydorus
Jocasta, wife/mother of Oedipus
Ino (Greek mythology), daughter of Cadmus
Niobe, wife of Amphion
Retrea, mother of Orion (mythology)

See also
Theban kings in Greek mythology